Uilta (also called  Ulta, Uilta, Ujlta, or Orok) is a Tungusic language spoken in the Poronaysky and Nogliksky Administrative Divisions of Sakhalin Oblast, in the Russian Federation, by the Uilta people. The northern Uilta who live along the river of Tym’ and around the village of Val have reindeer herding as one of their traditional occupations. The southern Uilta live along the Polonay near city of Polonask. The two dialects come from northern and eastern groups, however they have very few differences.

Classification
Uilta is closely related to Nanai, and is classified within the southern branch of the Tungusic languages. Classifications which recognize an intermediate group between the northern and southern branch of Manchu-Tungus classify Uilta (and Nanai) as Central Tungusic. Within Central Tungusic, Glottolog groups Uilta with Ulch as "Ulchaic", and Ulchaic with Nanai as "Central-Western Tungusic" (also known as the "Nanai group"), while Oroch, Kilen and Udihe are grouped as "Central-Eastern Tungusic".

Distribution
Although there has been an increase in the total population of the Uilta there has been a decrease in persons who speak Uilta as their mother tongue. The total population of Uilta was at 200 in the 1989 census of which 44.7, then increased to approximately 300-400 persons. However, the number of native speakers decreased to 25-16 persons.  According to the results of the Russian population census of 2002, Uilta (all who identified themselves as "Oroch with Ulta language", "Orochon with Ulta language", "Uilta", "Ulta", "Ulch with Ulta language" were attributed to Uilta) count 346 people, 201 of them – urban and 145 – village dwellers. The percentage of 18.5%, which is 64 persons pointed that they have a command of their ("Ulta") language, which, mostly, should be considered as a result of increased national consciousness in the post-Soviet period than a reflection of the real situation. In fact, the number of those people with a different degree of command of the Uilta language is less than 10 and the native language of the population is overwhelmingly Russian. Therefore because of the lack of a practical writing system and sufficient official support the Uilta language has become an endangered language.

The language is critically endangered or moribund. According to the 2002 Russian census there were 346 Uilta living in the north-eastern part of Sakhalin, of whom 64 were competent in Uilta. By the 2010 census, that number had dropped to 47. Uilta also live on the island of Hokkaido in Japan, but the number of speakers is uncertain, and certainly small. Yamada (2010) reports 10 active speakers, 16 conditionally bilingual speakers, and 24 passive speakers who can understand with the help of Russian. The article states that "It is highly probable that the number has since decreased further."

Uilta is divided into two dialects, listed as Poronaisk (southern) and Val-Nogliki (northern). The few Uilta speakers in Hokkaido speak the southern dialect. "The distribution of Uilta is closely connected with their half-nomadic lifestyle, which involves reindeer herding as a subsistence economy." The Southern Uilta people stay in the coastal Okhotsk area in the Spring and Summer, and move to the North Sakhalin plains and East Sakhalin mountains during the Fall and Winter. The Northern Uilta people live near the Terpenija Bay and the Poronai River during spring and summer, and migrate to the East Sakhalin mountains for autumn and winter.

Research 

Takeshiro Matsuura (1818-1888), a prominent Japanese explorer of Hokkaido, southern Sakhalin, and the Kuril Islands, was the first to make a notable record of the language. Matsuura wrote down about 350 Uilta words in Japanese, including about 200 words with grammatical remarks and short texts. The oldest set of known record of the Uilta language is a 369-entry collection of words and short sample sentences under the title "Worokkongo", dating from the mid-nineteen century. Japanese researcher Akira Nakanome, during the Japanese possession of South Sakhalin, researched the Uilta language and published a small grammar with a glossary of 1000 words. Other researchers who published some work on the Uilta were Hisharu Magata, Hideya Kawamura, T.I Petrova, A.I Novikova, L.I Sem, and contemporary specialist L.V. Ozolinga. Magata published a substantial volume of dictionaries called "A Dictionary of the Uilta Language / Uirutago Jiten" in 1981. Others contributing to Uilta scholarship were Ozolinga, who published two substantial dictionaries: one in 2001 with 1200 words, and one in 2003 with 5000 Uilta-Russian entries and 400 Russian-Uilta entries.

Phonology

Inventory 

Uilta has constrastive vowel length.

Phonotactics

Syllable structure 
Uilta has a (C)V(V)(C) syllable structure. Monosyllabic words always contain either a diphthong or a long vowel, thus no words have the structure *(C)V(C).

Morae 
Syllables can be further divided into morae which determine stress and timing of the word. The primary mora of a syllable consists of the vowel and the initial consonant if there is one. After the primary mora an additional each vowel or consonant in the syllable form secondary morae. Any word typically contains a minimum of two morae.

Pitch accent 
Uilta has non-phonemic pitch accent. Certain morae are accented with higher pitch. High pitch begins on the second mora and ends on the accent peak.  The accent peak falls on the second to last mora if it is primary and the closest preceding primary mora otherwise.

For example  is made of three syllables each consisting of one primary mora.  Thus the accent peak falls on ta, the penultimate mora.  In , there are two syllables and three morae, the penultimate mora is a a secondary mora, so the accent peak falls on the previous mora, ŋa.

Vowel harmony 

Words in Uilta exhibit vowel harmony. Uilta vowels can be divided into three groups based on how they interact with vowel harmony:

 Close:  
 Neutral:   
 Open:  

Close and open vowels cannot coexist with each other in the same word. Neutral vowels have no restrictions and can occur in words with close vowels, open vowels or other neutral vowels.

Orthography

An alphabetic script, based on Cyrillic, was introduced in 2007. A primer has been published, and the language is taught in one school on the island of Sakhalin. 

The letter  has been included in Unicode since version 7.0.

In 2008, the first Uilta primer was published, which established a writing system.

Morphology 

The Uilta language is formed by elements called actor nouns. These actor nouns are formed when a present participle is combined with the noun - ɲɲee. For example, the element - ɲɲee (< *ɲia), has become a general suffix for 'humans', as in ǝǝktǝ-ɲɲee ‛woman’, geeda-ɲɲee ‛one person’ and xasu-ɲɲee ‛how many people?’. Much of what constitutes Uilta and its forms can be traced back to the Ulch language.

Uilta has participial markers for three tenses: past -, present +ri, and future -li. When the participle of an uncompleted action, +ri, is combined with the suffix -la, it creates the future tense marker +rila-. It also has the voluntative marker (‘let us…!’) +risu, in which the element -su diachronically represents the 2nd person plural ending. Further forms were developed that were based on +ri: the subjunctive in + (fut-ptcp.pst-), the 1st person singular optative in +ri-tta, the 3rd person imperative in +ri-llo (+ri-lo), and the probabilitative in +ri-li- (ptcp.prs-fut).

In possessive forms, if the possessor is human, the suffix -ɲu is always added following the noun stem. The suffix -ɲu indicates that the referent is an indirect or an alienable possessee. To indicate direct and inalienable possession, the suffix -ɲu is omitted. For example, 
 ulisep -ɲu- bi 'my meat' vs. ulise-bi 'my flesh'
 böyö -ɲu- bi 'my bear' vs. ɲinda-bi 'my dog'
 sura - ɲu - bi 'my flea' vs. cikte-bi 'my louse'
 kupe - ɲu - bi 'my thread' vs. kitaam-bi 'my needle'

Pronouns are divided into four groups: personal, reflexive, demonstrative, and interrogative. Uilta personal pronouns have three persons (first, second, and third) and two numbers (singular and plural). 
	SG - PL
1st 	bii – buu
2nd 	sii – suu
3rd 	nooni – .

Syntax 
Noun phrases have the following order: determiner, adjective, noun.

N:noun
S:subject
O:object
V:verb

Subjects precede verbs:

With an object the order is SOV:

Adjectives go after their noun:

A sentence where the complement comes after its complement is a postposition:

See also 
 Orok people
 Sakhalin
 Ɲ ɲ, Letter of the Latin Alphabet thus, IPA.

Notes

References

Further reading 
 Majewicz, A. F. (1989). The Oroks: past and present (pp. 124–146). Palgrave Macmillan UK.
 Pilsudski, B. (1987). Materials for the study of the Orok [Uilta] language and folklore. In, Working papers / Institute of Linguistics Uniwersytet im. Adama Mickiewicza w Poznaniu.
 Matsumura, K. (2002). Indigenous Minority Languages of Russia: A Bibliographical Guide.
 Kazama, Shinjiro. (2003). Basic vocabulary (A) of Tungusic languages. Endangered Languages of the Pacific Rim Publications Series, A2-037.
 
 Tsumagari, T. (2009). Grammatical Outline of Uilta (Revised). Journal of the Graduate School of Letters, 41–21.
 Ikegami, J. (1994). Differences between the southern and northern dialects of Uilta. Bulletin of the Hokkaido Museum of Northern Peoples, 39–38.
 Knüppel, M. (2004). Uilta Oral Literature. A Collection of Texts Translated and Annotated. Revised and Enlarged Edition . (English). Zeitschrift für Ethnologie, 129(2), 317.
 Smolyak, A. B., & Anderson, G. S. (1996). Orok. Macmillan Reference USA.
 Missonova, L. (2010). The emergence of Uil'ta writing in the 21st century (problems of the ethno-social life of the languages of small peoples). Etnograficheskoe Obozrenie, 1100–115.
 Larisa, Ozolinya. (2013). A Grammar of Orok (Uilta). Novosibirsk Pablishing House Geo.
 Janhunen, J. (2014). On the ethnonyms Orok and Uryangkhai. Studia Etymologica Cracoviensia, (19), 71.
 Pevnov, A. M. (2009, March). On Some Features of Nivkh and Uilta (in Connection with Prospects of Russian-Japanese Collaboration). In サハリンの言語世界: 北大文学研究科公開シンポジウム報告書= Linguistic World of Sakhalin: Proceedings of the Symposium, 6 September 2008 (pp. 113–125). 北海道大学大学院文学研究科= Graduate School of Letters, Hokkaido University.
 Ikegami, J. (1997). Uirutago jiten [A dictionary of the Uilta language spoken on Sakhalin].
 K.A. Novikova, L.I. Sem. Oroksky yazyk // Yazyki mira: Tunguso-man'chzhurskie yazyki. Moscow, 1997. (Russian)
 

Agglutinative languages
Vowel-harmony languages
Tungusic languages
Languages of Russia
Sakhalin Oblast
Endangered languages